Jeotgalibaca ciconiae is a Gram-positive, facultatively anaerobic and non-spore-forming bacterium from the genus Jeotgalibaca which has been isolated from the faeces of an oriental stork (Ciconia boyciana).

References

Lactobacillales
Bacteria described in 2020